Thomas Charles Ravenscroft Walters (born 30 January 1976) is a South African politician of the Democratic Alliance (DA) who has been serving as a Member of the National Assembly of South Africa since May 2014. He served as a Member of the Gauteng Provincial Legislature from 2009 to 2014. In 2012, Walters was elected Deputy Federal Council Chairperson of the Democratic Alliance, and has been deputising Federal Council Chairperson Helen Zille since 2019. He deputised James Selfe from 2012 to 2019. Walters was the party's Shadow Minister and Shadow Deputy Minister of Rural Development and Land Reform.

Early life and career
Thomas Walters obtained a Bachelor of Arts in political science from the University of Stellenbosch. He also completed the Management Advancement Programme at the Wits Business School. He later attained a Masters of Business Administration from the Gordon Institute of Business Science and the University of Pretoria's Business School.

Political career
Walters was a student leader of the now-defunct Democratic Party. He had also served as the Democratic Alliance's Federal Youth Chairperson. He was later elected to the Johannesburg City Council as a DA councillor.

Walters was elected to the Gauteng Provincial Legislature in April 2009. He was appointed the party's Provincial Spokesperson on Agriculture and Rural Development. In November 2009, he was elected Provincial Chairperson of the Democratic Alliance in Gauteng. Walters stood down as Provincial Chairperson in March 2012, and Mike Moriarty was elected to succeed him.

In November 2012, Walters was elected Deputy Chairperson of the Democratic Alliance Federal Council, defeating John Steenhuisen.

During the 2014 general election that was held on 7 May, Walters was elected to the National Assembly of South Africa. He was sworn in as an MP on 21 May 2014. In June 2014, the Parliamentary Leader of the Democratic Alliance, Mmusi Maimane, appointed Walters as Shadow Minister of Rural Development and Land Reform. Walters was later demoted to Shadow Deputy Minister of Rural Development and Land Reform.

In 2015, he was re-elected as deputy chairperson of the DA's Federal Council. He won another term at the party's 2018 Federal Congress. Also, at the 2018 Federal Congress, DA delegates voted to add another deputy chairperson to the Federal Council and Natasha Mazzone was elected to fill the position. Walters left the Shadow Cabinet in June 2019.

In October 2019, Walters declared his intention to contest the DA Federal Council chairpersonship election after James Selfe had announced his retirement. Helen Zille won the election.

He was re-elected as a deputy chairperson of the DA Federal Council at the party's elective congress in October 2020. He now serves alongside James Masango and Ashor Sarupen (later elected in a special election). Helen Zille remains the chairperson of the federal council.

References

External links
People's Assembly profile

Living people
Stellenbosch University alumni
University of the Witwatersrand alumni
Democratic Alliance (South Africa) politicians
Members of the National Assembly of South Africa
1976 births
People from Gauteng
Politicians from Gauteng
Members of the Gauteng Provincial Legislature
Democratic Party (South Africa) politicians
21st-century South African politicians